Baalis (Ba‘ălīs; Ammonite: 𐤁𐤏𐤋𐤉𐤔𐤏, B‘LYŠ‘) is the name given in the Book of Jeremiah for the king of Ammon. He instigated the murder of Gedaliah, the Babylonian-appointed Jewish governor of Jerusalem.

Seal of Ba’alis 
When the Babylonians conquered Judah in the early 6th century BCE and destroyed Jerusalem, they made Gedaliah, a member of a prominent Jerusalem family, governor of Judah. But he was soon murdered, an event still commemorated in Jewish tradition by an annual fast. The assassin was sent by none other than Ba'alis, King of the Ammonites (Jeremiah 40:13 - 41:2).

Ba'alis's seal (shown on the cover of the issue of Biblical Archaeology Review, where this article was first published) is made of brown agate with white bands and is in fact quite tiny (0.5 inches in diameter and 0.2 inches thick). A small hole was drilled through the center of the scarab-shaped seal for the setting.

On the seal are three lines of script, each separated by double rules:

 "[Belonging to] Ba'alis"
 "King of"
 "B[nei Ammo]n"
As indicated by the brackets, the first and last letters in the first line have been reconstructed, but their reconstruction was easy.#1

Almost all seals begin with a lamed, or l, meaning "belonging to." The last letter of the line, also missing, completes the spelling of the name.

Much more needs to be reconstructed in the damaged third line. Only traces of the first and last letters are visible: the head of the first letter, bet, and upper edge of the last letter, nun. But this is enough to reconstruct the line as Bnei Ammon—literally, the Sons of Ammon, or the Ammonites—since the named king, Ba'alis, is known as an Ammonite king. Indeed, in the Biblical passage that mentions Ba'alis (Jeremiah 40:14), he is referred to as the "King [of the] Bnei Ammon," the same term that we have reconstructed here based on the first and last letters. The same term appears on a well-known bronze bottle, called a situla, found at Tell Siran in Jordan. (see sidebar)#2

The script on our seal is typically Ammonite. It is a mark of how far our epigraphic knowledge has developed that we can distinguish between the closely related scripts of the Israelites, the Ammonites, the Moabites and the Edomites.#3

The name Ba'alis means "Ba'al has saved," or "Ba'al is salvation." This is not the first time Ba'alis has appeared in the archaeological record. His name also appears in an inscription excavated at Tel el-'Umeiri in Jordan. This seal impression, made by a high official of the king, reads "Milqom, servant of Ba'alis."#4

The iconography of the royal Ba'alis seal is as interesting as its inscription: The center and largest register depicts a winged sphinx wearing an Egyptian-style apron. Although the Egyptian influence is clear and strong, just as it is in Israelite culture (perhaps mediated through Phoenicia), the sphinx here has identifying characteristics particular to Ammonite culture. The sphinx has a tail in the shape of the letter S. It curves upward to the right and then finishes in a loop to the left.

An identical sphinx is depicted on another Ammonite seal belonging to one "Pado'el" (see sidebar).#5

Pado'el's seal does not give his title, but we know from cuneiform texts from Mesopotamia that Pado'el was the name of an Ammonite king.#6 If, as appears likely, this type of sphinx was an Ammonite royal emblem, then the seal of Pado'el probably belonged to the king himself, even though the seal does not identify him as such. Buttressing the suggestion that this is a royal symbol is an Edomite seal impression bearing the name of the Edomite king Qosgabri, which contains a very similar sphinx with an identical tail.#7 Apparently this was a royal emblem in both Edom and Ammon.

Biblical Archaeology Review, March/April 1999, Pages 48–9

Still another Ammonite king appears in a bulla also being published here for the first time (see sidebar), but this Ammonite king is otherwise unknown. This bulla comes from the collection of Shlomo Moussaieff. It is made of black clay and is only a little more than a half inch in diameter. The seal impression on the clay is about a quarter of an inch in diameter. A groove around the seal impression indicates that the seal was set in a metal bezel. On the back of the bulla we can see the impression of the cord that tied the document and the texture of the papyrus roll sealed by the bulla. Around the edge appear fingerprints that could well belong to the king himself.

Strangely, for a king, his seal is purely epigraphic; it contains nothing but an inscription (Ammonite seals are usually rich in iconography.) Perhaps the royal emblem was on the back of the seal, in which case it would not appear on the bulla.

The inscription is divided into two registers by the common double line and surrounded by a framing border line. The letters are typically Ammonite.#8 Two dots are marked at the end of the second line to fill the empty space. The bulla, like the seal of Ba'alis, was purchased in London from a Jordanian antiquities dealer.

The inscription reads:

 ("lbrk'l") "Belonging to Barak'el"
 "hmlk" "the king"
The name Barak-el means "Blessed of God (El)" ("El" is a generic term for God used in the Hebrew Bible). The same name also appears in the Bible: The father of Job's friend Elihu is named Barak-el (Barachel) (Job 32:2,6).

The name was apparently common among the Ammonites; we know of three Ammonites called Barak-el.#9 However, now we know that there was a hitherto unknown king by this name as well. The paleography—the shape and form of the letters—indicates that he ruled sometime in the first half of the 7th century BCE.

The list of known Ammonite kings is short, so the discovery of a new one is especially important. Some are mentioned in the Bible. In addition to Ba'alis, the Bible also refers to an Ammonite king named Nahash, who threatened to gouge out the right eyes of the men of Jabesh-Gilead (1 Samuel 11:1-2). Nahash ruled in the tenth century BCE, the time of David. Nahash's son, who succeeded him as king, is identified as Hanun (I Chronicles 9:1-2). A number of other Ammonite kings are known from cuneiform inscriptions. The total, until the appearance of Barak-el, was nine. Now it is ten.

Sources 
https://web.archive.org/web/20110518153408/http://www.robert-deutsch.com/en/monographs/m7

Kings of Ammon
Monarchs of the Hebrew Bible
6th-century BC biblical rulers